The Péninsule Loranchet, also known as Presqu'île Loranchet, (Loranchet Peninsula in English) is a peninsula of Grande Terre, the main island of the subantarctic Kerguelen archipelago in the southern Indian Ocean.

Description
The peninsula occupies the north-western corner of Grande Terre and is named after Jean Loranchet, the first officer of Raymond Rallier du Baty’s second Kerguelen survey expedition in 1913. It has a rugged, mountainous interior, with altitudes exceeding 500 m and a coastline of steep cliffs deeply incised by fjords. It is some 50 km long with a width of up to 20 km. As with most of Grande Terre it is infested with introduced feral cats, rats and rabbits. Human visitation is infrequent.

Important Bird Area
The northern end of the peninsula, and the northernmost part of Grande Terre, extending northwards from the head of the Baie de la Dauphine, has been identified as a 60 km2 Important Bird Area (IBA) by BirdLife International because of its breeding seabirds. At least 23 bird species breed in the IBA. As well as a colony of 250,000 pairs of macaroni penguins at the tip of the peninsula, there are also 5,400 pairs of southern rockhopper penguins and a small colony of 400 pairs of black-browed albatrosses. Cape petrels and Kerguelen shags nest on the cliffs. Other birds include light-mantled albatrosses, Kerguelen terns and Eaton's pintails. Antarctic fur seals and southern elephant seals breed in the IBA.

References

Landforms of the Kerguelen Islands
Important Bird Areas of Kerguelen
Loranchet
Loranchet